The Prix Marie-Andrée-Bertrand is an award by the Government of Quebec that is part of the Prix du Québec. It is awarded to persons whose scope and scientific quality of research led to the development and implementation of social innovations, leading to the well-being of individuals and communities. Only the disciplines of the humanities and social sciences are recognized for this award. It is named in honour of Marie-Andrée Bertrand.

Winners
2012 - Louise Nadeau
2013 - Marguerite Mendell
2014 - Camil Bouchard
2015 - Benoît Lévesque
2016 - Carole Lévesque
2017 - Richard E. Tremblay
2018 - Francine de Montigny
2019 - Francine Descarries

See also

 List of social sciences awards

References

Canadian science and technology awards
Prix du Québec